Soda or SODA may refer to:

Chemistry
  Some chemical compounds containing sodium 
 Sodium carbonate, washing soda or soda ash
 Sodium bicarbonate, baking soda 
 Sodium hydroxide, caustic soda
 Sodium oxide, an alkali metal oxide
 Soda glass, a common glass made with sodium carbonate or sodium oxide
 Soda lake, an alternate generic name for a salt lake, with high concentration of sodium carbonates
 Soda lime, a mixture of sodium, calcium, and potassium hydroxides
 Soda pulping, a process for paper production using sodium compounds

Computing
 SODA (operating system)
 Service-oriented development of applications
 Service-oriented device architecture, to enable devices to be connected to a service-oriented architecture
 Service-oriented distributed applications
 Simple Object Database Access, an API for database queries
 Soda PDF, a family of applications used on .pdf files
 Symposium on Discrete Algorithms, an annual academic conference in computer science

Entertainment
 Czech Soda (Česká soda), a satirical Czech television show
 "Go For Soda", a song by Canadian singer Kim Mitchell
 Soda (comics), a popular Belgian comics series by Philippe Tome and Bruno Gazzotti
 Soda Drinker Pro, a video game that simulates the act of drinking soda
 SODA Off-Road Racing, a 1997 video game
 Soda (TV series), a French television show
 Soda Pictures, a UK film distributor
 Soda Stereo, an Argentine rock band also known as "Soda"

Food and drink

 Soft drink, a sweetened, carbonated, and usually flavored drink
 Ice cream soda, a dessert dish
 Soda bread, a variety of quick bread
 Soda cracker, or saltine cracker
 Soda water, carbonated water

People with the surname
 Soda (footballer) (1901-unknown), Brazilian footballer
 Chet Soda (1908–1989), Californian businessman associated with the Oakland Raiders
, Japanese documentary filmmaker
, Japanese basketball player
, Japanese manga artist
, retired Japanese footballer

Places
 Soda Butte Creek, in Yellowstone National Park
 Soda Creek, in Canada
 Soda Gulch
 Soda Lakes
 Soda Mountain Wilderness
 Soda Mountains, in the eastern Mojave Desert in California
 Soda Springs (disambiguation), several places
 Soda Springs, California (disambiguation)
 Soda Springs, Idaho, a city in Caribou County, Idaho, United States
 Soda, Rajasthan, a village in India

Other uses
 Salsola soda, the saltwort plant
 Short-course Off-road Drivers Association, a former off-road racing sanctioning body in the United States
 Sibling of a deaf adult, an acronym in deaf culture for a person with a deaf sibling
 Simple Ocean Data Assimilation, a reanalysis project
 Soda gun, a device used by bars to serve carbonated and non-carbonated drinks
 Soda locomotive, a variant of fireless locomotives
 Soda straw, a cave feature
 Specific oral direct anticoagulant, a type of anticoagulant
 Statement of Demonstrated Ability, a document for pilots

See also 
 Soda Lake (disambiguation)

Japanese-language surnames